Alois Lang (1872–1954) was a Master Woodcarver at the American Seating Company, and one of the artists responsible for bringing the medieval art of ecclesiastical carving to life in the United States.

Lang was born in Oberammergau in Bavaria, a town long known for its excellence in wood carving. He was apprenticed to his cousin Andreas Lang around the age of 14, spent one year's study with the great wood sculptor Fortunato Galli in Florence, Italy, and moved to the United States in 1890 at the age of 19. Lang first found work in Boston carving elaborate mantelpieces for Back Bay families.

In 1903, he moved westward and joined the American Seating Company of Manitowoc, Wisconsin, moving with the firm to Grand Rapids, Michigan in 1927.  Lang became well known as a prominent ecclesiastical wood-carver. An article in a 1946 newsletter states that “recently the Michigan Academy of Science, Arts and Letters presented him with a special award for his contribution to art in Michigan.”

His carvings can be found in numerous buildings, mostly churches, throughout the United States, including:

Peachtree Christian Church, Atlanta, Georgia 
Rockefeller Chapel, Chicago, Illinois
Christ Church Cathedral, Springfield, Massachusetts (reredos, narthex portal and screen)
Christ Church, Cranbrook, Bloomfield Hills, Michigan
Covenant Lutheran Church, Stoughton, Wisconsin (hand-carved altar with illustration patterned after Leonardo DaVinci's painting, "The Last Supper", originally installed in Central Lutheran Church, Stoughton, Wisconsin)
Emmanuel Episcopal Church, La Grange, Illinois (Last Supper, reredos originally installed in Christchurch, Chicago, Illinois)
National Shrine of the Little Flower, Royal Oak, Michigan
St. Mark's Episcopal Church, Grand Rapids Michigan
Christ Church, Boston, Massachusetts
All Saints Church, Pasadena, California
Church of the Incarnation, Great Falls, Montana
Saint Paul's Episcopal Church, Lansing, Michigan
Christ Episcopal Church, Ottawa, Illinois
First (Park) Congregational Church, Grand Rapids, Michigan
The Emmanuel Lutheran Church, Rockford, Illinois
Wicker Park Lutheran Church, Chicago, Illinois
Grosse Pointe Memorial Church, Grosse Pointe, Michigan
Christ Episcopal Cathedral, Salina, Kansas
 Hope Church (Reformed Church in America), Holland, Michigan
Zion Evangelical United Church of Christ (Indianapolis, Indiana)
St. Marcus Evangelical & Reformed (United Church of Christ) (St. Louis, Missouri)
St. John's Episcopal Church, Detroit, Michigan
Central United Methodist Church, Detroit, Michigan.  (Hughes 1967, www.centralumchurch.org)
High Street United Methodist Church  (Springfield, Ohio)
St. Mark's Episcopal Pro-Cathedral (Hastings, Nebraska)
Union Avenue Christian Church (St. Louis, MO)

Sources

Hendry, Fay, L., Balthazar Korab, photographs, "Outdoor Sculpture of Kalamazoo", iota press, Okemos, Michigan 1980
Hughes, D. Dale.  "Conscience of A City: The History of Central Methodist Church", Detroit, MI 1967.
McMechan, Jervis Bell, "Christ Church Cranbrook: 1928 – 1978", Christ Church Cranbrook, Bloomfield Hills, Michigan 1979
American Seater newsletter, March 19, 1946
Ohnsman, Stephen, Pastor of Calvary UCC, 2013

American woodcarvers
1872 births
1954 deaths
German emigrants to the United States
People from Garmisch-Partenkirchen (district)